Roland/Edirol Sound Canvas lineup is a series of General MIDI (GM) based pulse-code modulation (PCM) sound modules and sound cards, primarily intended for computer music usage, created by Japanese manufacturer Roland Corporation. Some models include a serial or USB connection, to a personal computer.

Products

Sound Canvas

In some cases also sold as "Edirol" rather than "Roland" as the brand name.

Sound Canvas Personal Computer Products

Computer Music Products

Sound Canvas and Keyboard

The following combine a sound canvas module with a built in MIDI keyboard

Edirol

Roland sold GM/GS products under its Edirol brand. The samples contained in the ROMs of these units do not in all cases mirror the original SC-7 / SC-55 GM/GS samples. GM2 is downward compatible with GM. The SD line was also sold under the "Roland" brand.

Virtual Sound Canvas

There is also the VSC, Virtual Sound Canvas, range of PC software which provide GM and GS
synthesis on Windows PCs. Many versions of Cakewalk's Sonar software came bundled with a copy of VSC, though from Sonar 4 onwards they ship with the improved TTS-1 softsynth, which Roland has sold previously through its Edirol subsidiary as the HyperCanvas.

Microsoft GS Software Wavetable Synthesizer
The Microsoft GS Software Wavetable Synthesizer, included in instances of DirectX as an integral part of DirectMusic, and on every Windows computer since 1998, is an offshoot of the Roland Virtual Sound Canvas with the GS sound set, licensed by Microsoft in 1996. A four-megabyte file, titled "GM.DLS", contains the sample set in DLS format.

Apple QuickTime Software Wavetable Synthesizer
In 1997, Apple licensed the complete Roland Sound Canvas instrument set and GS Format extensions for improved playback of MIDI music files in QuickTime 3.0. This replaced the limited set of instrument sounds licensed from Roland in QuickTime 2.x.

Distribution

North America 
Roland Systems Group U.S.

Europe 
EDIROL Europe Ltd., London, UK

References

External links

 Another Roland timeline
 Private Owner On Line Roland Museum
 VSC-55 details
 Roland GS history page

Sound cards
Sound modules
S